Concerto No. 5 may refer to:

Piano Concerto No. 5 (disambiguation)
Piano Concerto No. 5 (Beethoven) in E-flat major, Emperor
Piano Concerto No. 5 (Field) in C major, L'incendie par l'orage
Piano Concerto No. 5 (Herz) in F minor
Piano Concerto No. 5 (Litolff) in C minor
Piano Concerto No. 5 (Moscheles) in C major
Piano Concerto No. 5 (Mozart) in D major
Piano Concerto No. 5 (Prokofiev) in G major
Piano Concerto No. 5 (Rubinstein) in E-flat major
Piano Concerto No. 5 (Saint-Saëns) in F major, Egyptian
Piano Concerto No. 5 (Bach) in F minor, (BWV 1056)
 Violin Concerto No. 5 (disambiguation)
Violin Concerto No. 5 (Mozart) in A Major
Violin Concerto No. 5 (Paganini) in A minor
Violin Concerto No. 5 (Vieuxtemps) in A minor
The fifth of the Harpsichord concertos (J. S. Bach)
The fifth of the Brandenburg_concertos

See also
Concerto